Simhadhwani is a 1992 Indian Malayalam film, directed by K. G. Rajasekharan. The film stars Thilakan, Urvashi, Suresh Gopi and Mala Aravindan in the lead roles. The film has musical score by Kannur Rajan.

Cast

Devi Bala As Molly Thomas
Thilakan
Urvashi
Suresh Gopi
Mala Aravindan
M. G. Soman
Balan K. Nair
Captain Raju
Shari
P. R. Varalekshmi
Pattom Sadan
Sujatha

A.T.Samuel(Sam)

Soundtrack
The music was composed by Kannur Rajan and the lyrics were written by Mankombu Gopalakrishnan.

References

External links
 

1992 films
1990s Malayalam-language films
Films directed by K. G. Rajasekharan